Grégory Rast (born 17 January 1980 in Cham) is a Swiss former professional road bicycle racer, who rode professionally between 2001 and 2018 for the , , ,  and  teams. He was the winner of the Swiss National Road Race Championships in 2004 and 2006. Rast now works as a directeur sportif for the  team. His sporting career began with RMV Cham-Hagendorn.

Major results

2002 
 1st  Road race, National Under-23 Road Championships
 3rd Overall Grand Prix Guillaume Tell
1st Stage 4
 3rd La Côte Picarde
 4th Grand Prix de Waregem
 9th GP Kranj
2003
 8th Trofeo Alcudia
 8th Stausee-Rundfahrt Klingnau
2004
 1st  Road race, National Road Championships
 4th Rund um den Henninger Turm
2005
 3rd Paris–Bourges
 7th Stausee-Rundfahrt Klingnau
2006
 1st  Road race, National Road Championships
 2nd Giro del Piemonte
 3rd Grand Prix of Aargau Canton
 6th Vattenfall Cyclassics
 9th GP Ouest France-Plouay
2007
 1st  Overall Tour de Luxembourg
1st Stage 4
 7th Trofeo Calvia
2008
 1st Grand Prix Istanbul
 5th Overall Four Days of Dunkirk
 6th Overall Tour of Poland
 7th Trofeo Sóller
 9th Brabantse Pijl
2009
 1st Stage 4 (Team time trial) Tour de France
 1st Prologue Tour de Luxembourg
 1st  Sprints classification Tour de Romandie
2010
 9th Overall Tour de Luxembourg
 9th Kuurne–Brussels–Kuurne
2011
 4th Paris–Roubaix
2012
 8th Road race, Olympic Games
2013
 1st Stage 6 Tour de Suisse
 5th Road race, National Road Championships
2014
 5th Road race, National Road Championships
2015
 1st Stage 1 (Team time trial) Tour of Alberta

References

External links 

 

Palmares at Cycling Base 

1980 births
Living people
Swiss male cyclists
Olympic cyclists of Switzerland
Cyclists at the 2004 Summer Olympics
Cyclists at the 2012 Summer Olympics
People from Cham, Switzerland
Sportspeople from the canton of Zug
Presidential Cycling Tour of Turkey stage winners
Tour de Suisse stage winners